Gandys Beach is a census-designated place (CDP) in Cumberland County, New Jersey, United States. It is in the southwestern part of the county, in the western part of Downe Township, on the shore of Delaware Bay.

Gandys Beach was first listed as a CDP prior to the 2020 census.

Demographics

References 

Census-designated places in Cumberland County, New Jersey
Census-designated places in New Jersey
Downe Township, New Jersey